The 2007 Women's Medibank International began on January 7, 2007, and finished January 13, 2007.

Seeds
The seeded players are listed below. Players in bold are still in the competition. The players no longer in the tournament are listed with the round in which they exited.

  Amélie Mauresmo (quarterfinals)
  Svetlana Kuznetsova (second round)
  Kim Clijsters (champion)
  Nadia Petrova (second round)
  Martina Hingis (first round)
  Elena Dementieva (second round)
  Patty Schnyder (second round)
  Nicole Vaidišová (semifinals)

Draw

Key
 Q = Qualifier
 WC = Wild card
 r = Retired

Finals

Top half

Bottom half

Notes
The winner received $88,265 and 275 ranking points.
The runner-up received $47,125 and 190 ranking points.
The last direct acceptance was Vera Zvonareva (ranked 24th).
The Players' Representative was Francesca Schiavone.

External links
 Medibank International website

Women's Singles
2007 WTA Tour